Balad is an Arab political party in Israel led by Sami Abu Shehadeh. The party advocates for the rights of Arab citizens in Israel.

Name
The party is known by the acronym of its Hebrew name, Brit Leumit Demokratit; Balad is also an Arabic word meaning "country" or "nation". Its full Arabic name is at-Tajammuʿ al-Waṭanī ad-Dīmuqrāṭī.

Ideology
Balad is a political party whose stated purpose is the "struggle to transform the state of Israel into a democracy for all its citizens, irrespective of national or ethnic identity". It opposes the idea of Israel as a Jewish state, and supports its creating a new "binational" state.

Balad also advocates that the state of Israel recognize Arabs as a national minority, entitled to all rights that come with that status including autonomy in education, culture and media. Since the party's formation, it has objected to every proposed state budget.

The party supports the creation of two states based on pre-1967 borders, with the West Bank, Gaza Strip, and East Jerusalem to constitute a Palestinian state and returning Palestinians who left homes in Israel to where they were.

History

Balad was formed and registered as a political party in 1995, by a group of young Israeli Arab intellectuals headed by Azmi Bishara. In the 1999 elections, Balad ran on a joint ticket with Ta'al, headed by MK Ahmad Tibi. They won two seats. However, a request was submitted that same year for the list to disband, and did so after the Knesset approved the request. Bishara remained its only member.

In 2001 party leader Azmi Bishara gave a speech in Umm al-Fahm on the 33rd anniversary of Israel's victory in the Six-Day War, deploring it, and later visited Syria and gave a speech mourning the death of Syria's President, Hafez al-Assad a year before, and expressing solidarity with Syria's and Hezbollah's fight against Israel. Upon his return to Israel, parliamentary immunity was removed from him by a vote of the Israeli Knesset, and in 2002 he was charged and indicted for supporting terrorist organizations against Israel and siding with her enemies, and also for violating Israel's Emergency Regulations in that he knowingly assisted Israeli citizens to enter Syria without approval of the Minister of Interior. The trial was however cancelled, after The High Court of Justice ruled in favor of a petition submitted by Bishara where he protested that his speeches were protected by legal immunity, which is granted to all Knesset members in order to allow them to fulfill their duties. His parliamentary immunity was immediately restored.

Prior to the 2003 elections, the Central Elections Committee banned the party from running by a one-vote margin, claiming it did not respect Israel's legally-mandated status as a Jewish state and that its leader supported terrorism. The move to ban Balad was initiated by Michael Kleiner, the leader of the right-wing Herut party, who alleged that Balad was "a cover-up for illegal activity" and that it "supports terror organizations, identifies with the enemy and acts against Israel as a Jewish and democratic state". The Gush Shalom activist group criticized the decision saying it introduced into the committee the "aggressive, predatory and racist attitudes of the majority of the extreme right" who they believe favor banning all Arab MKs. Bishara personally responded to the Election Committee's charges that he supported Hezbollah by saying, "I believe that a people living under occupation [have] the right to fight against it, but I never called on the Palestinians to embark on an armed struggle against Israel. I never supported violent activity." The Elections Committee had also voted to ban Ahmad Tibi of the Ta'al party who had formed an electoral alliance with the left wing Hadash coalition.

However, the bans on both parties were overturned by the Israeli Supreme Court. Supreme Court Justice Misha'el Kheshin told the election committee that Bishara's past expressions of support for Hezbollah in Lebanon had angered him, although he voted to allow him to run in the elections because "Israel's democracy is strong and can tolerate irregular cases", and thought that there was insufficient evidence for the ban. Balad won three seats in the elections, filled by Bishara, Wasil Taha, and Jamal Zahalka.

In the 2006 elections Balad won three seats, which were taken by Bishara, Taha, and Zahalka. However, more controversy was to come when, after the 2006 Lebanon War, all three visited Syria and Lebanon in September 2006 and expressed solidarity for Hezbollah in its fight against Israel. Particularly strong statements were made by Bishara. They returned to Israel on 16 September, saying they planned to return to Syria again "if necessary". A police investigation was launched into their activities in enemy territories.

Following this, Bishara was charged anew with supporting terrorism against Israelis, to which was added the charge of treason and various other criminal charges including receiving large sums of money from a foreign agent in return for his services, and money laundering. Although he promised to return from a few days' trip abroad to continue questioning by the authorities, after several weeks in other Arab states he instead resigned from the Knesset at the Israeli Embassy in Cairo on 22 April 2007. Bishara denied the charges but did not return to Israel to face court proceedings. He was said to be "considering staying abroad because he feared a long term jail sentence and an end to his political career". Bishara was replaced in the Knesset by Said Nafa. Abroad, Bishara actively promoted political charges of "apartheid" against Israel in various Arab and Western venues, travelling widely. Nevertheless, he continued to accept Israeli pension payments made to former Knesset members for nearly four years, until, in February 2011, the Knesset passed a bill revoking pensions for lawmakers who have evaded an investigation or trial for serious offenses.

On 12 January 2009, Balad was disqualified from the 2009 Israeli elections by the Central Elections Committee by a vote of 26 to 3, with one abstention. It was disqualified on grounds that it does not recognize the State of Israel and calls for armed conflict against it. Zahalka argued that the decision was related to Operation Cast Lead, and said that he is not surprised by it "because the vote was taken for political motives due to the war atmosphere. ... The committee members sought to increase their popularity at our expense on the backdrop of the elections." On 19 January Attorney General Menachem Mazuz, said that he saw no grounds to prevent the Balad from taking part in the election, and noted that the decision was based on "flimsy evidence". On 21 January the Supreme Court of Israel overturned the Committee's decision by a majority of eight to one. Zahalka said: "Balad stands by its platform. The court's decision is a victory to the Arab public and to anyone who seeks democracy. ... We call on everyone to back the notion of 'a people state' and a life of equality bar discrimination." Balad maintained its three seats in the Knesset after the 2009 elections.

All-Arab Joint List in the 2015 election 

Ahead of the 2015 Knesset election, the electoral threshold was raised from 2% to 3.25%, forcing small parties into alliances. While Balad had initially mulled a narrower cooperation with the southern branch of Islamist Islamic Movement in Israel, public pressure amongst its Arab constituency forced the party to give in to a larger alliance. In January 2015, Balad signed an agreement with the other three Arab-dominated parties, Hadash, the United Arab List and Ta'al, to form a single Joint List, an ideologically diverse list including communists, socialists, feminists, Islamists, and Palestinian nationalists.

In March, Joint List leader Ayman Odeh explored the possibility of a limited surplus vote-sharing agreement with Meretz. After Hadash and the United Arab List had come out in favor of such a left-wing bloc, Balad however vehemently opposed the idea. Though even within Balad, the more moderate faction around Jamal Zahalka was said to support an agreement, sided with the fundamentalist faction around party founder Azmi Bishara to ultimately veto any agreement with Meretz. Meretz subsequently slammed the List for having chosen nationalism and separatism over Jewish–Arab solidarity.

With 10.55% of the total vote, the Joint List received 13 seats, becoming the third-largest party in the 20th Knesset.

Knesset election results

See also
 Pan-Arabism
 Anti-Zionism

References

External links

 Arabs48 Newspaper affiliated with Balad 
 Balad Knesset website

Political parties in Israel
1995 establishments in Israel
Anti-Zionism in Israel
Anti-Zionist political parties
Arab nationalism in Israel
Arab nationalist political parties
Arab political parties in Israel
Left-wing nationalist parties
Pan-Arabist political parties
Political parties established in 1995
Secularism in Israel
Social democratic parties in Israel